Tetris Online, Inc. was an American video game developer and publisher. The company was the exclusive online licensee of Tetris in North America and Europe. It was founded in January 2006 by Nintendo of America founder and former president Minoru Arakawa, video game designer and publisher Henk Rogers and Tetris creator Alexey Pajitnov. Tetris Online, Inc. is the developer of social games Tetris Battle and Tetris Friends.  In March 2013, Tetris Online, Inc. laid off 40% of its staff.

The company ceased all operations on May 31, 2019. Along with this shutdown, Tetris Friends also ceased all operations.

Games
Tetris Online, Inc. developed and published the following games for consoles, handheld devices, online and download from its inception in 2006 to its shutdown in 2019.

References

External links
 Tetris Online, Inc.

Tetris
Defunct video game companies of the United States
Video game companies established in 2006
Video game companies disestablished in 2019
2006 establishments in Hawaii
2019 disestablishments in Hawaii
Defunct companies based in Hawaii